Kamal Djunaedi Stadium is a multi-use stadium in Jepara, Indonesia.  It is currently used mostly for football matches and was previously the home stadium of Persijap Jepara. The stadium holds 15,000 people.

References

Football venues in Indonesia
Sports venues in Indonesia
Buildings and structures in Central Java